This is a list of diplomatic missions in Barbados. The capital city of Bridgetown and its immediate environs hosts 10 high commissions or embassies, a Delegation of the European Commission, and an Eastern Caribbean mission of the United Nations.  Several other countries have honorary consuls to provide emergency services to their citizens.

Embassies/High Commissions in Bridgetown
Entries marked with an asterisk (*) are member-states of the Commonwealth of Nations. As such, their embassies are formally termed as high commissions.

Other missions or delegations in Bridgetown 
, Hastings (Christ Church)  Mission for the CARIFORUM free-trade area (CARICOM-Dom. Republic and European Commission)
 Eastern Caribbean office at Marine Gardens, Hastings (Christ Church) 
Food and Agriculture Organization of the United Nations (FAO) 
International Telecommunication Union (ITU) 
Interpol 
Pan American Health Organization (PAHO) / World Health Organization (WHO) 
UN Women 
United Nations Development Programme (UNDP) 
United Nations Fund for Population Activities (UNFPA) 
United Nations International Children's Emergency Fund (UNICEF) 
United Nations Office for Project Services (UNOPS)  
United Nations World Food Programme (WEF)

Gallery

Consulate General in Bridgetown

Non-resident embassies/high commissions accredited to Barbados 

Resident in Caracas, Venezuela:

 
 

 

 

 
 
 

 
 

Resident in Havana, Cuba:

 
 
 
 
 

Resident in New York City, United States of America:

Resident in Port-of-Spain, Trinidad and Tobago:

 
 
 
 

 
 

 
 
 

 

Resident in Washington, D.C., United States of America:

 
 

 
 

Resident elsewhere:

 (Bogotá)
 (Nassau)
 (Ottawa)
 (Kingston)
 (Copenhagen)
 (Castries)
 (Kingston)
 (Paramaribo)
 (Castries)
 (Oslo)
 (Georgetown)
 (Kingston)
 (Ottawa)
 (Brasília)
 (Bogotá)

Former missions 
  (Unknown–2004)
  (1968–1977)
  (Closed in 1995)

See also 
List of Ambassadors and High Commissioners to and from Barbados
Foreign relations of Barbados
List of diplomatic missions of Barbados

References

External links
 
 Barbados Diplomatic List

 
 
Diplomatic missions
Barbados